Nicholas J. Lesselyoung (November 25, 1917 – July 21, 1987) was a member of the Wisconsin State Assembly.

Biography
Lesselyoung was born on November 25, 1917, in Chilton, Wisconsin. He graduated from Chilton High School and Marquette University Law School. During World War II, he served in the United States Navy. He died on July 21, 1987.

Political career
Lesselyoung was elected to the Assembly in 1950. He was a Republican.

References

People from Chilton, Wisconsin
Republican Party members of the Wisconsin State Assembly
Military personnel from Wisconsin
United States Navy sailors
United States Navy personnel of World War II
Marquette University Law School alumni
1917 births
1987 deaths
20th-century American politicians